The 2008 "Final Four" was an international baseball competition held in Barcelona, Spain on September 14–15, 2008. It featured 4 teams from the professional leagues in Italy and Spain.

In the end Caffè Danesi Nettuno from Nettuno, Italy won the tournament.

Game Results

Semi finals

3rd place

Final

Final standings

External links
Game Results

References

Final Four (Baseball), 2008
2008
European Champion Cup Final Four